The AEF Monotrace is a French ultralight trike, designed and produced by AEF Air Lift System of Houilles. The aircraft is supplied as a complete ready-to-fly-aircraft.

Design and development
The Monotrace was conceived as a soaring trike with retractable main landing gear. It also complies with the requirements of the US FAR 103 Ultralight Vehicles rules. It features a cable-braced hang glider-style high-wing, weight-shift controls, a single-seat open cockpit, quadracycle landing gear and a single engine in pusher configuration.

The aircraft is made from bolted-together aluminum tubing, with a composite partial cockpit fairing. A full fairing that can be adjusted in flight to provide wing trim is optional. The 50% double surface wing is covered in Dacron sailcloth, is supported by a single tube-type kingpost and uses an "A" frame weight-shift control bar. The powerplant is an air-cooled, two-stroke,  Simonini Mini 3 engine, with the Simonini Mini 2+ or the Electravia engines optional. The landing gear consists of four wheels: a fixed nose wheel and fixed main centre-line wheel and two retractable outrigger wheels.

A number of different wings can be fitted to the basic carriage, including the standard Ellipse Titan and the optional Ellipse Fuji.

Specifications (Monotrace)

See also
Electravia Monotrace-E, an electric-powered variant

References

External links

2000s French sport aircraft
2000s French ultralight aircraft
Single-engined pusher aircraft
Ultralight trikes